James McPherson Proctor (September 4, 1882 – September 17, 1953) was a United States circuit judge of the United States Court of Appeals for the District of Columbia Circuit and previously was an associate justice of the District Court of the United States for the District of Columbia.

Education and career

Born in Washington, D.C., Proctor received a Bachelor of Laws from the George Washington University Law School in 1904. He was an Assistant United States Attorney of the District of Columbia from 1905 to 1913, becoming the Chief Assistant United States Attorney of that district in 1909. He was in private practice in Washington, D.C. from 1913 to 1931, serving as a Special Assistant United States Attorney General from 1929 to 1931.

Federal judicial service

Proctor was nominated by President Herbert Hoover on February 6, 1931, to an Associate Justice seat on the Supreme Court of the District of Columbia (Associate Justice of the District Court of the United States for the District of Columbia from June 25, 1936, now Judge of the United States District Court for the District of Columbia) vacated by Associate Justice William Hitz. He was confirmed by the United States Senate on February 25, 1931, and received his commission on March 2, 1931. His service terminated on March 5, 1948, due to his elevation to the District of Columbia Circuit.

Proctor was nominated by President Harry S. Truman on February 2, 1948, to an Associate Justice seat on the United States Court of Appeals for the District of Columbia (Judge of the United States Court of Appeals for the District of Columbia Circuit from June 25, 1948) vacated by Associate Justice Harold Montelle Stephens. He was confirmed by the Senate on March 2, 1948, and received his commission on March 5, 1948. His service terminated on September 17, 1953, due to his death.

References

Sources
 

1882 births
1953 deaths
Judges of the United States District Court for the District of Columbia
United States district court judges appointed by Herbert Hoover
Judges of the United States Court of Appeals for the D.C. Circuit
United States court of appeals judges appointed by Harry S. Truman
20th-century American judges
Assistant United States Attorneys